Air tank may refer to:
 Diving cylinder, used by scuba divers to hold air and other breathing gases at high pressure underwater
 Pneumatic pressure vessel, for storing compressed air to operate equipment such as braking systems, paint dispensers and paintball guns